Telomerase protein component 1 is an enzyme that in humans is encoded by the TEP1 gene.

Function 

This gene product is a component of the ribonucleoprotein complex responsible for telomerase activity which catalyzes the addition of new telomeres on the chromosome ends. The telomerase-associated proteins are conserved from ciliates to humans. It is also a minor vault protein.

References

Further reading